Blasphemy, Mayhem, War is a Split EP by thrash metal bands Evil Damn, Chainsaw Killer & Toxic Holocaust released under Warhymns Records.

Track listing

Personnel
Toxic Holocaust
 Joel Grind - vocals, drums, bass, guitar

Evil Damn
Romanet - bass
Satyricon - drums
Ordep - guitars
Zemog - guitars
Neyra - vocals

Chainsaw Killer
J. Scepter - vocals
J. Zummon - guitars
R. Zummon - drums

References

2005 EPs
Toxic Holocaust albums